Aporcelaimidae is a family of nematodes belonging to the order Dorylaimida.

Genera

Genera:
 Akrotonus Thorne, 1974
 Amblydorylaimus Andrassy, 1998
 Aporcedorus Jairajpuri & Ahmad, 1983

References

Nematodes